Arthur G. Hyatt (June 29, 1912 – January 3, 1991) was an American professional basketball player. Hyatt played in the National Basketball League from 1938 to 1940, competing first for the Cleveland White Horses and then for the Detroit Eagles. He was the brother of Charley Hyatt, a well-known collegiate basketball player in the 1920s.

References

1912 births
1991 deaths
Amateur Athletic Union men's basketball players
American men's basketball players
Basketball players from Pittsburgh
Cleveland White Horses players
Detroit Eagles players
Guards (basketball)
People from University Place, Washington